Muro Lucano formerly Muro (until 1863) is a city and comune in the province of Potenza, in the northern part of the region of Basilicata, southern Italy.

History

The city is situated on the site of the ancient Numistri, at the foot of the Apennines, the scene of a clash between Hannibal and Marcellus' forces in the Second Punic War in the year 210 BC.

After the Angevin period, Muro Lucano's castle saw long feuding by the Orsini family until the end of Italian feudalism in 1806. In the eighteenth century, after the earthquake of 1694, the Orsinis made profound changes to the manor by raising the ground floor, knocking down the drawbridge and building a new building leaning on the two towers. The 1980 earthquake necessitated an extensive consolidation process. The part called the prince's apartment had recently been restored.

Invasion of Muro

On 23 November 1861, Carmine Crocco and  attacked Muro. In retaliation, national guards, soldiers and citizens, deployed in naturally strong positions, welcomed Crocco's men with shots, disrupting their formations that were forced to flee after suffering heavy losses.

Two years after King Victor Emmanuel II was proclaimed King of Italy, the suffix Lucano was added in order to distinguish the city from Muro Leccese.

Earthquake

On 23 November 1980, Muro Lucano was strongly affected by the Irpinia earthquake. The city's infrastructure was severely damaged, the renovation of which, for over forty years, has been at the center of a strong controversy. There were multiple disputes over housing due to the new architectural plans of the administration, some houses were forced to be connected to one another. The administrations that have succeeded one another to date have admitted the delay in the restructuring works, represented in particular by the state of the elementary schools in the municipality.

Honors
On 23 November 1980, the date of the earthquake, Muro Lucano received the Gold Medal for Civil Merit.

On 4 October 2012, the President of the Italian Republic Giorgio Napolitano accepted the request of Interior Minister Anna Maria Cancellieri which gave Muro Lucano the honorary title of City.

Main sights

The city has a  cathedral; and it was in its castle that Queen Joan I of Naples was murdered on the orders of her adopted son Charles III of Naples.

Geography

Overview

The city of Muro Lucano is composed of the old town and the surrounding areas of Cappuccini to the north and Giardini (meaning gardens) to the south. The population, which was over 10,000 in the 1950s, has been declining steadily through the years due to social changes, lack of local work and large scale emigration. There are about 2,200 families with an average of close to 2.7 people per family.

The city lies on a slope over the Muro ravine, with quaint houses built on terraces. The name of the city comes from the medieval wall (in Italian muro) that surrounded the medieval centre.

Dialect
Murese, the city's dialect, is spoken only in the immediate vicinity and can be difficult for Italian speakers to comprehend.

Notable people
 Anne Bancroft - actress
 Salvatore Capezio - shoemaker
 Joan I of Naples - queen
 Antonio Rosario Mennonna - prelate
 Saint Gerard Majella - Catholic saint
 Bartolomeo Rosa (1648–1688) - bishop 
 Joseph Stella - painter
 Cristian Zaccardo - footballer
 Filomena Cerone - celebrity, resides in Wolfsburg

Twin towns and municipalities
 Contursi Terme, Italy
 Karlsfeld, Germany

References

External links

Cities and towns in Basilicata